Sir James Monteith Grant  FRHSC (Hon) (19 October 1903 – 1 December 1981) was Lord Lyon King of Arms of Scotland from 1969 to 1981.

Educated at the Edinburgh Academy and the University of Edinburgh, where he studied law, he was appointed a Writer to the Signet (WS) in 1927. His first heraldic appointment was as Carrick Pursuivant in 1946. He was promoted to Marchmont Herald in 1957 and then to Lord Lyon in 1969. He was also Secretary to the Order of the Thistle from 1971 until 1981. From his retirement as Lord Lyon in 1981, he again held the post of Marchmont Herald until his death later that year.

He was a Fellow of the Society of Antiquaries of Scotland (FSA Scot), a Knight of the Venerable Order of St John (KStJ) from 1970, and a Commander 2nd Class of the Order of the Polar Star (KNO2kl) of Sweden from 1975. He was appointed a Knight Commander of the Royal Victorian Order (KCVO) in 1969.

Arms

See also
Officer of Arms
King of Arms
The Heraldry Society of Scotland

References

External links
Coat of Arms as Lord Lyon King of Arms

1903 births
1981 deaths
Lord Lyon Kings of Arms
Knights Commander of the Royal Victorian Order
Fellows of the Society of Antiquaries of Scotland
Knights of the Order of St John
Order of the Polar Star
People educated at Edinburgh Academy
Alumni of the University of Edinburgh
20th-century antiquarians